The 1907 St. Vincent's football team was an American football team that represented St. Vincent's College, now known as DePaul University, as an independent during the 1907 college football season.

Schedule

References

St. Vincent's
DePaul Blue Demons football seasons
St. Vincent's football